A referendum on transferring ownership to the United States was held on 9 January 1868 on the islands of Sankt Jan and Sankt Thomas, two of three main islands in the Danish West Indies. In the referendum, held by universal male suffrage, voters could approve or reject the outcome of negotiations for the sale of the two islands to the United States for US$7.5 million. The third island, Sankt Croix, was to be sold separately to the US at a later date.

The sale was approved by 98.26% of voters. Although it was a binding referendum, the US Senate finally reneged on the agreement in 1870. The Islands were later transferred to the United States after a second referendum in 1916 and the subsequent Treaty of the Danish West Indies.

Results

See also
1870 Dominican Republic annexation referendum
1877 Saint Barthélemy status referendum

References

1868 referendums
Referendums in Danish West Indies
1868 elections in the Caribbean
January 1868 events
History of the Danish West Indies
Denmark–United States relations
United States–Caribbean relations
Sovereignty referendums
History of United States expansionism
Proposed states and territories of the United States